Socrates Drank the Conium was the 1971 debut album of the Greek rock band of the same name.  It has more psychedelic- and blues-influenced tracks than their following albums.  The work on this album is similar to that of musicians like Jimi Hendrix and Eric Clapton.

Track listing
All songs credited to Spathas and Tourkogiorgis; other collaborators are noted.  
"Live In The Country" — 3:43
"Something In The Air"  (D. Wood) — 3:21
"Bad Conditions" — 3:59
"It's A Disgusting World"  (Boukouvalas) — 6:52
"Close The Door And Lay Down" — 3:12
"Blind Illusion" — 3:33
"Hoo Yeah!" — 3:36
"Underground"  (D. Wood) — 4:40
"Starvation" — 3:45

Sources

1971 debut albums
Socrates Drank the Conium albums
Ancient Greece in art and culture